MHSK was an Uzbekistani football club based in Tashkent. Its abbreviation meant Army Central Sports Club, similar to the Soviet equivalent CSKA.

History
The year of establishment is unknown, yet the club participated in the Soviet competitions since 1946. Until 1988 it played as part of the Soviet Armed Forces sports club which often was changing its name. Since 1955 it was named as SKA Tashkent. In 1989 it was transformed into a junior squad as Regional School of Higher Sports Mastery, SKA-RShVSM Tashkent. With the fall of the Soviet Union in 1992, the club became a farm club of FC Pakhtakor Tashkent as Pakhtakor-79 Tashkent. Since 1993 and until 2001 the club played as MHSK Tashkent.

MHSK Tashkent played 7 seasons in Uzbek League: 1992–1998. In that time club won championship in 1997 and runner-up in 1995 Uzbek Cup. One year later in 1998 season, club finished 16th and relegated to lower division. In 1999–2000 club played in Uzbekistan First League. Before the start of 2001 season in First League, MHSK officially withdrew from competition.

Name changes history
 until 1992: Umid
 1992: Pakhtakor-79
 1993: Binokor
 1993—2001: MHSK

Honours
 Uzbek League champion: 1
 1997
 Uzbek Cup runner-up: 1
 1995

Managerial history

References

External links
 MHSK matches and results
 Weltfussballarchiv

Defunct football clubs in Uzbekistan
Football clubs in Tashkent